The Jardin botanique du Puech is a private botanical garden located in Le Puech, Hérault, Languedoc-Roussillon, France, which contains a variety of fruit trees and Mediterranean plants. As of January 2009, it is unclear whether the garden is still open to the public.

See also 
 List of botanical gardens in France

References 
 Terre Equestre entry (French)
 Route d'Herault entry (French)
 Nuxit entry (French)
 Jardin Botanique at Le Puech - RIP?

Puech, Jardin botanique du
Puech, Jardin botanique du